Pascack Brook County Park, 137 acre (55.4 hectare) county park, is located on Emerson Road in Westwood, New Jersey, about a mile (1.6 km) east of Westwood (NJT station) and half a mile upstream from the mouth of Pascack Brook.  From intersection of Old Hook Road and Emerson Road, travel north on Emerson Road - entrance is on the left (west side of Emerson Road).

Facilities 
Pascack Brook County Park has two picnic areas, one baseball field, one softball field, playground, basketball court, tennis courts, a bike path, and fishing.

External links 
Pascack Brook County Park
"NJ Birding & Wildlife Trails: Pascack Brook County Park"
Pascack Brook County Park Photos & Description

References 

County parks in New Jersey
Pascack Valley
Parks in Bergen County, New Jersey